Ariel Zev Emanuel (born 1961) is an American businessman and the CEO of Endeavor, an entertainment and media agency that owns the UFC. He was a founding partner of the Endeavor Talent Agency and was instrumental in shaping its June 2009 merger with the William Morris Agency.

Background

Born to a Jewish family in Chicago, Emanuel was raised in suburban Wilmette, Illinois. Emanuel is the brother of former Mayor of Chicago Rahm Emanuel, American oncologist and bioethicist Ezekiel Emanuel, and sister Shoshana Emanuel (who was adopted). His father, Jerusalem-born Dr. Benjamin M. Emanuel, is a pediatrician who was active in the Irgun, a Zionist paramilitary group, that operated in Mandatory Palestine during the 1930s and 1940s His mother, Marsha Emanuel (née Smulevitz), was a civil rights activist, and the one-time owner of a Chicago-area rock and roll club. During his third grade at school, Ari was diagnosed with ADHD and dyslexia. In addition to school, his mother spent many hours helping him to learn to read. She hired tutors and private instructors to give him private reading lessons at home.

In 1996, Emanuel married girlfriend Sarah Hardwick Addington; they have three sons. After 20 years of marriage, Emanuel filed for divorce at Los Angeles County Court, citing "irreconcilable differences".  In May 2022, he married fashion designer Sarah Staudinger, founder of the Los Angeles label STAUD.

Career

Prior to founding Endeavor, Emanuel was a partner at InterTalent and senior agent at ICM Partners (ICM).

Emanuel has been described as a mogul and power player in Hollywood. Emanuel and Patrick Whitesell, the co-CEO of WME, have both been named to Fortune'''s Businessperson of the Year list. In a May 2013 article on Emanuel, Fortune called him "one of the biggest guns in the consolidating entertainment business".

Emanuel's relationships with his clients, coupled with his stature in the industry, has led to various homages and parodies over the years, including Bob Odenkirk's character Stevie Grant on The Larry Sanders Show, and Ari Gold, played by Jeremy Piven on the HBO television show Entourage. In 2011, Emanuel co-founded TheAudience with Sean Parker and Oliver Luckett.

Emanuel has served as a member of Live Nation Entertainment board of directors since September 2007.

Endeavor went public in 2021 with Emanuel owning a stake worth around $480 million according to Bloomberg.

He and Patrick Whitesell are also co-CEO of IMG, a global sports, events and talent management company headquartered in New York City.

 Public advocacy 

Emanuel has hosted fundraisers for the Democratic Party. He donated $2,700 to Hillary Clinton in the 2016 U.S. presidential election. His long-standing relationship with his former client Donald Trump is well documented. Trump gave $50,000 to Rahm Emanuel's mayoral campaign in 2010 in spite of their political differences.

During the 2016 Presidential primaries Emanuel offered to produce a movie for his former client Donald Trump which was considered for the 2016 Republican National Convention but ultimately was not followed through on.

After disappearance of Washington Post journalist Jamal Khashoggi on 2 October 2018 and reports that the Saudi hit squad had assassinated him inside their consulate in Turkey Emanuel called White House senior adviser and Trump son-in-law Jared Kushner. Emanuel tried to extricate Endeavor from a $400 million deal with the Saudi Arabian government.

In October 2022, Emanuel urged businesses to stop working with rapper Kanye West over his antisemitic comments.

Controversy
An April 2002 lawsuit by agent Sandra Epstein against Endeavor Agency brought forth accusations by Epstein and other Endeavor employees against Emanuel. In the court filings, Emanuel is alleged to have allowed a friend to operate a pornographic website out of Endeavor's offices. According to Epstein, Emanuel made racist and anti-gay remarks and prevented her from sending a script about Navy SEALs to actor Wesley Snipes, saying: "That is the dumbest thing I've ever heard. Everyone knows that blacks don't swim." Emanuel disputed these accusations at the time. Epstein's claims were settled for $2.25 million.

Art philanthropy
Emanuel has in the past been active on the board of trustees of P.S. Arts, a Los Angeles, California-based nonprofit organization that works to bring art education programs to Southern California schools.  He has also helped the Museum of Contemporary Art, Los Angeles, establish MOCAtv, a dedicated YouTube art channel. In 2012, he joined the museum's board.

References

External links
Political blog at The Huffington Post''
 After getting $60 million in equity Mati Kochavi & Ari Emanuels HEED shuts down

1961 births
20th-century American businesspeople
21st-century American businesspeople
Jewish American philanthropists
American people of Israeli descent
American people of Moldovan-Jewish descent
American talent agents
Businesspeople from Illinois
Literary agents
Living people
Macalester College alumni
New Trier High School alumni
People from Wilmette, Illinois
Philanthropists from Illinois
21st-century American Jews